Herzog & de Meuron Basel Ltd., is a Swiss based architecture firm with its head office in Basel, Switzerland, founded by Jacques Herzog (born 19 April 1950) and Pierre de Meuron (born 8 May 1950).  Both attending the Swiss Federal Institute of Technology (ETH) in Zurich. They are perhaps best known for their conversion of the giant Bankside Power Station in London to the new home of Tate Modern. Herzog and de Meuron have been professors at ETH Zürich from 1999 until 2018, co-founding ETH Studio Basel in 1999 with architects Roger Diener and Marcel Meili in the department of architecture. Both have been visiting professors at the Harvard University Graduate School of Design, with Jacques Herzog also a visiting tutor at Cornell University College of Architecture, Art and Planning.

History
Herzog & de Meuron was founded in Basel in 1978. In 2001, Herzog & de Meuron were awarded the Pritzker Prize, the highest of honours in architecture. Jury chairman J. Carter Brown commented, "One is hard put to think of any architects in history that have addressed the integument of architecture with greater imagination and virtuosity", in reference to HdM's use of exterior materials and treatments, such as silkscreened glass. Architecture critic and Pritzker juror Ada Louise Huxtable summarized HdM's approach: "They refine the traditions of modernism to elemental simplicity, while transforming materials and surfaces through the exploration of new treatments and techniques." In 2006, The New York Times Magazine called them "one of the most admired architecture firms in the world."

Selected projects

Since 2022
 Kinderspital Zürich, Zürich, Switzerland
 New North Zealand Hospital, Hillerød, Denmark
 UCSF Helen Diller Medical Center, Parnassus Heights, San Francisco, USA
 HORTUS, Allschwil, Basel, Switzerland
 University Hospital Basel, Perimeter B, Basel, Switzerland
 Sixth & Blanco, Austin, Texas, USA
 Ronquoz 21, Sion, Switzerland
 Autobahnkirche, Andeer, Switzerland
 Memphis Brooks Museum of Art, Memphis, Tennessee, USA
 Powerhouse Arts, Brooklyn, USA
 Lombard Odier New Headquarters, Bellevue, Switzerland
 Park Avenue Armory, New York, USA
 National Library of Israel, Jerusalem
 Vancouver Art Gallery, Vancouver, Canada
Tour Triangle, Paris, France
Calder Gardens, Philadelphia, USA

Completed
 2022 Roche Tower 2, Basel, Switzerland
 2022 Royal College of Art, London, UK
 2021 ST International HQ and SONGEUN Art Space, Seoul, South Korea
 2021 MKM Museum Küppersmühle, Extension, Duisburg, Germany
 2021 AstraZeneca Discovery Centre (DISC), Cambridge, UK
 2021 M+, Hong Kong – with Farrells
 2020 Extension of the Stadtcasino Basel, Basel, Switzerland
 2020 REHAB Extension, Basel, Switzerland
 2020 UNIQLO Tokyo, Tokyo, Japan
 2018 Tai Kwun, Hong Kong – with Purcell and Rocco Design
 2017 56 Leonard Street, New York City, USA
 2017 Beirut Terraces, Beirut, Lebanon
 2016 Tate Modern 2, Bankside, London
 2016 , Milan, Italy
 2016 Elbphilharmonie, Hamburg, Germany
 2016 Schaudepot, Vitra Design Museum, Weil am Rhein, Germany
 2015 Roche Tower Basel, Switzerland
 2015 Blavatnik School of Government, University of Oxford, UK
 2015 Nouveau Stade de Bordeaux, France
 2015 BBVA headquarters, Madrid, Spain
 2015 Unterlinden Museum, Colmar, France
 2014 Ricola Krauterzentrum, Laufen, Switzerland
 2013 Pérez Art Museum Miami, Miami, Florida
 2013 Messe Basel, Basel, Switzerland
 2012 Serpentine Gallery Pavilion, London, UK
 2012 Parrish Art Museum, Water Mill, New York
 2010 1111 Lincoln Road parking garage, Miami Beach, Florida, USA
 2010 Museum der Kulturen, Basel, Switzerland
 2009 VitraHaus, Weil am Rhein, Germany
 2008 Beijing National Stadium, Beijing, China
 2008 CaixaForum Madrid, Madrid, Spain
 2008 Tenerife Espacio de las Artes, Santa Cruz de Tenerife, Canary Islands, Spain
 2007 40 Bond Street, New York City, US
 2005 M. H. de Young Memorial Museum, San Francisco, California
 2005 Walker Art Center expansion, Minneapolis, Minnesota
 2005 Allianz Arena football stadium, Munich
 2004 Forum Building, Barcelona (since 2011 hosts the Museum of Natural Sciences of Barcelona)
 2004 Informations-, Kommunikations- und Medienzentrum Cottbus, Cottbus, Germany
 2003 Laban Dance Centre, Deptford Creek, London, UK
 2003 Prada Aoyama, Tokyo, Japan
 2003 Schaulager, Laurenz Foundation, Münchenstein, Switzerland
 2002 St. Jakob-Park, Basel, Switzerland
 2002 REHAB Clinic for Neurorehabilitation and Paraplegiology, Basel, Switzerland 
 2000 Tate Modern, Bankside, London, UK
 1999 Swiss Federal Railways Signal Box, Basel, Switzerland
 1998 Dominus Winery, Napa Valley, California
 1992 Goetz Collection, Munich, Germany
 1988 Stone House, Tavole, Italy

Exhibitions

Current and upcoming
 14 July — 15 October 2023: Herzog & de Meuron at Royal Academy of Arts, London 
 24 October 2022 – 1 April 2023: Lusail Museum: Tales of a Connected World at Lusail Museum, Qatar

Past
 30 September – 20 November 2021: Exploring Songeun Art Space at ST International HQ and SONGEUN Art Space, Seoul, Korea
 Project 2018; Show 4 May 2018: Herzog & de Meuron for Prada. Showspace for Prada Resort 2019 at Piano Factory, New York, New York, USA
 Project 2017–2018; Show 14 January 2018: Language Restraint: Herzog & de Meuron for Prada. Collection Items for Prada Invites 2018, Milan, Italy
 13 June – 20 August 2017: Summer Exhibition 2017 at Architecture Gallery, Royal Academy of Arts, London, UK
 10 February – 1 May 2017: Elbphilharmonie Revisited at Hall for Contemporary Art, Deichtorhallen, Hamburg, Germany
 10 September 2016 – 13 February 2017: Building Optimism: Public Space in South America at the Heinz Architectural Center, Carnegie Museum of Art, Pittsburgh, PA, USA
 20 March – 4 October 2016: Material Future: The Architecture of Herzog & de Meuron and the Vancouver Art Gallery at Vancouver Art Gallery, Vancouver, Canada
 24 January – 20 June 2016: Agir, Contempler, Inaugural exhibition conceived by Jean-François Chevrier with Herzog & de Meuron at Musée Unterlinden, Colmar, France
 2016: Rémy Zaugg. The Question of Perception at Museum für Gegenwartkunst Siegen, Siegen, Germany and Museo Nacional Centro de Arte Reina Sofía, Madrid, Spain
 31 October 2014 – 4 January 2015: Triangle, Paris at Pavillon de l’Arsenal, Paris, France
 14 – 22 June 2014: 14 Rooms curated by Klaus Biesenbach and Hans Ulrich Obrist. A Collaboration between Fondation Beyeler, Art Basel and Theater Basel at Hall 3, Messe Basel, Basel, Switzerland
 10 January – 9 February 2014: Building M+: The Museum and Architecture Collection at ArtisTree, Hong Kong
 19 June – 3 November 2013: Stadium Model by Herzog & de Meuron, Nouveau Stade de Bordeaux. Arc en Rêve, Centre d’Architecture, Bordeaux, France.
 2 September – 23 October 2011: Design is Design is not Design curated by Ai Weiwei and Seung H-Sang, Gwangju Design Biennale, South Korea
 10 January – 15 March 2008: Contribution to Hong Kong & Shenzen Bi-City Biennale of Urbanism / Architecture: Refabricating City at Old Central Police Station Compound, Hong Kong, China
 3 June – 5 August 2007: Studio as Muse. Design for the New Parrish at Parrish Art Museum, Southampton, NY, USA
 2004–2006 (multiple showings): An Exhibition by Schaulager Basel and Herzog & de Meuron at Schaulager Basel, Münchenstein, Switzerland 
 23 October 2002 – 6 April 2003: Herzog & de Meuron. Archéologie de l'Imaginaire, curated by Philip Ursprung, Canadian Centre for Architecture, Montréal, Canada
 2 March – 8 April 2001: Works in Progress. Projects by Herzog & de Meuron and by Rem Koolhaas /OMA at Fondazione Prada, Milan, Italy
 4 November 2000 – 11 February 2001: In Process curated by Philip Vergne, Walker Art Center, Minneapolis, MN, USA
 12 May – 26 November 2000: Herzog & de Meuron – 11 Stations at Tate Modern opening exhibition curated by Theodora Vischer in collaboration with Käthe Walserby at Tate Modern Turbine Hall, London
 1 July – 5 October 1999: The Un-Private House at The Museum of Modern Art, New York, USA
 31 May – 3 July 1997: Herzog & de Meuron. Zeischnungen Drawings at Peter Blum Gallery, Soho, New York, USA
 22 November 1996 – 9 January 1997: Architectures of Herzog & de Meuron. Portraits by Thomas Ruff at Peter Blum Gallery Soho, New York, USA and 22 November 1996 –9 January 1997 at TN Probe Exhibition Space, Tokyo, Japan 
 8 March – 22 May 1995: Herzog & de Meuron, Une Exposition, conceived by Rémy Zaugg at Centre Pompidou, Paris, France
 12 October – 11 December 1994: Contribution to Bienal Internacional de Arte De São Paulo 22. Swiss Pavilion Architecture of Herzog & de Meuron Pavilhão Ciccillo Matarazzo, Parque do Ibirapuera, São Paulo, Brazil
 26 May − 2 July 1994: Five Competition Entries at Swiss Institute, New York, New York, USA
 1 March – 7 April 1991: Architektur von Herzog de Meuron im Kunstverein München at Kunstverein München, Munich, Germany 
 26 January – 24 March 1991: Contribution to Berlin Morgen. Ideen für das Hery Einer Grosstadt Berlin Zentrum at Deutsches Architektur-Museum, Frankfurt a. M., Germany
 1 October – 20 November 1988: Architektur Denkform, Architekturmuseum Basel, Switzerland

Contributions to the Venice Biennale

 2014 No. 14 Fundamentals: Lucius Burckhardt and Cedric Price – A Stroll Through A Fun Palace, Swiss Pavilion,  Venice, Italy
 2012 No. 13 Common Ground: Herzog & de Meuron. Elbphilharmonie – The construction site as a common ground of diverging interests at Arsenale Corderie, Venice, Italy
 2008 No. 11 Architecture Beyond Building: Herzog & de Meuron and Ai Weiwei. Installation Piece at Italian Pavilion, Giardini, Venice, Italy
 1996 No. 6 Sensing the Future. The Architect as Seismograph: Contribution to the Venice Biennale International Pavilion at Giardini, Venice, Italy

Selected publications

Complete works (Birkhäuser)
 Gerhard Mack, Herzog & de Meuron: Herzog & de Meuron 2002–2004. The Complete Works. Volume 5. Birkhäuser, 2020.
 Gerhard Mack, Herzog & de Meuron: Herzog & de Meuron 2005–2007. The Complete Works. Volume 6. Birkhäuser, 2018.
 Gerhard Mack, Herzog & de Meuron: Herzog & de Meuron 1997–2001. The Complete Works. Volume 4. Birkhäuser, 2008.
 Gerhard Mack, Herzog & de Meuron: Herzog & de Meuron 1992–1996. The Complete Works. Volume 3. Birkhäuser, 2000.
 Gerhard Mack, Herzog & de Meuron: Herzog & de Meuron 1989–1991. The Complete Works. Volume 2. Birkhäuser, 2005.
 Gerhard Mack, Herzog & de Meuron: Herzog & de Meuron 1978–1988. The Complete Works. Volume 1. Birkhäuser, 1997.

Portfolios (special editions on Herzog & de Meuron)
 Luis Fernández-Galiano (Ed.): Herzog & de Meuron 2003–2019. (Vol.2), Madrid, Arquitectura Viva SL, 12.2019.
 Luis Fernández-Galiano (Ed.): Herzog & de Meuron 1978–2002. (Vol.1) Madrid, Arquitectura Viva SL, 12.2019.
 Luis Fernández-Galiano (Ed.): Arquitectura Viva Monografias. Herzog & de Meuron 2013–2017. Vol. No. 191-192, Madrid, Arquitectura Viva SL, 12.2016.
 Luis Fernández-Galiano (Ed.): Arquitectura Viva Monografías. Herzog & de Meuron 2005–2013. Vol. No. 157/158, Madrid, Arquitectura Viva SL, 09.2012.
 Luis Fernández-Galiano (Ed.): Arquitectura Viva Monografías. Herzog & de Meuron 2000–2005. Vol. No. 114, Madrid, Arquitectura Viva, 07.2005.
 Luis Fernández-Galiano (Ed.): Arquitectura Viva. Herzog & de Meuron 1978–2007. 2nd rev. ed. Madrid, Arquitectura Viva, 2007.
 Luis Fernández-Galiano (Ed.): Arquitectura Viva. Herzog & de Meuron. 1980–2000. Vol. No. 77, Madrid, Arquitectura Viva, 07.1999.
 Dino Simonett: Herzog & de Meuron 001–500. Index of the Work of Herzog & de Meuron 1978–2019. Edited by: Dino Simonett, Herzog & de Meuron. Basel, Simonett & Baer, 2019
 Fernando Márquez Cecilia; Richard Levene (Eds.): El Croquis. Herzog & de Meuron 2005–2010. Programme, Monument, Landscape. Vol. No. 152/153, Madrid, El Croquis, 2010.

Single project monographs
 Gerhard Mack, Herzog & de Meuron: Herzog & de Meuron. Elbphilharmonie Hamburg. Edited by: Herzog & de Meuron. Basel, Birkhäuser, 2018.
 Herzog & de Meuron, Park Avenue Armory: Herzog & de Meuron Transforming Park Avenue Armory New York. Edited by: Gerhard Mack. Basel, Birkhäuser, 2014.
 Tate Modern. Building a Museum for the 21st Century. Edited by: Chris Dercon and Nicholas Serota. London, Tate Publishing, 2016
 Herzog & de Meuron + Ai Weiwei. Serpentine Gallery Pavilion 2012. Edited by: Sophie O'Brien with Melissa Larner and Claire Feeley. Exh. Cat. Serpentine Gallery Pavilion 2012. London, Koenig Books / Serpentine Gallery, 2012.
 Work in Progress. Herzog & de Meuron's Miami Art Museum. Exh. Cat. Work in Progress: Herzog & de Meuron's Miami Art Museum. Miami Art Museum. 1 December 2007 – 6 April 2008. Miami, Miami Art Museum, 2007.
 Expanding the Center. Walker Art Center and Herzog & de Meuron. Edited by: Andrew Bauvelt. Minneapolis, Walker Art Center, 2005.
 Prada Aoyama Tokyo. Edited by: Germano Celant. 2nd ed. Milan, Progetto Prada Arte srl, 2003.

Teaching/research
 Roger Diener, Jacques Herzog, Marcel Meili, Pierre de Meuron, Manuel Herz, Christian Schmid, Milica Topalovic: The Inevitable Specificity of Cities. Edited by: ETH Studio Basel. Zurich, Lars Müller Publishers, 2015.
 Jacques Herzog, Pierre de Meuron, Manuel Herz: MetroBasel. Ein Modell einer europäischen Metropolitan-Region. Edited by: ETH Studio Basel. Basel, ETH Studio Basel, 2009.
 Jacques Herzog, Pierre de Meuron: The Canary Islands. Open – Closed. An urban Research Study on the Canary Islands. ETH Studio Basel, Contemporary City Institute, Basel, 2007.

Exhibition catalogues, critical readings and focus statements
 Herzog & de Meuron. Natural History. Edited by: Philip Ursprung. Exh. Cat. Herzog & de Meuron. Archaeology of the Mind. Canadian Centre for Architecture, Montreal. 23 October 2002 – 6 April 2003. Baden, Lars Müller, 2002
 Jacques Herzog, Philip Ursprung, Jeff Wall: Pictures of Architecture. Architecture of Pictures. A Conversation between Jacques Herzog and Jeff Wall. Edited by: Cristina Bechtler. Vienna / New York, Springer, 2004.
 Jacques Herzog, Pierre de Meuron: Treacherous Transparencies. Thoughts and observations triggered by a visit to the Farnsworth House. Barcelona, Actar Publishers / IITAC Press, 2016.
 Roger Diener, Jacques Herzog, Marcel Meili, Pierre de Meuron, Christian Schmid: Switzerland. An Urban Portrait. Birkhäuser, 2006. Vol. No. 1-4.

Awards
 1999 Schock Prize
 2001 Prix de l'Équerre d'Argent, for Apartment Buildings, Rue Des Suisses, Paris
 2001 Pritzker Architecture Prize
 2003 Stirling Prize for the Laban Dance Centre
 2007 RIBA Royal Gold Medal and Praemium Imperiale
 2009 RIBA Lubetkin Prize for the Beijing National Stadium
 2014 Mies Crown Hall Americas Prize
 2017 RIBA National Award 2017 for the Tate Modern Project

Style
HdM's early works were reductivist pieces of modernity that registered on the same level as the minimalist art of Donald Judd. However, their recent work at Prada Tokyo, the Barcelona Forum Building and the Beijing National Stadium for the 2008 Olympic Games, suggest a changing attitude. The shapes and forms of some of the works suggest art glass and objects d'art that one would see on a coffee table, like an art deco ashtray or quirky container for chocolates – a building becomes a blown-up version of desk art because the computer can do it, mimic the plasticity of the medium, and make it possible as a feat of engineering.

HdM's commitment of articulation through materiality is a common thread through all their projects. Their formal gestures have generally progressed from the purist simplicity of rectangular forms to more complex and dynamic geometries. The architects often cite Joseph Beuys as an enduring artistic inspiration and collaborate with different artists on each architectural project. Their success can be attributed to their skills in revealing unfamiliar or unknown relationships by utilizing innovative materials.

Ethics
Herzog & de Meuron has faced criticism for their vision on migrant workers in Beijing during the construction of the Beijing National Stadium. In a July 2008 interview with German magazine Der Spiegel, Jacques Herzog was criticised for not having done more to ensure the conditions under which migrant workers constructed the stadium by the interviewer, to which Jacques Herzog responded that the influence of the architect on the construction process is declining rapidly.

On the other hand, some scholars such as Deyan Sudjic have stated that the very building of the stadium sent a signal from the Western architecture firm to the Chinese government to change societal norms. However, others have argued that this statement would go with any stadium design, decreasing the potential of the signal.

References

External links

  Official website

 
 
Architecture firms of Switzerland
Pritzker Architecture Prize winners
Rolf Schock Prize laureates
Stirling Prize laureates
German architects
Recipients of the Royal Gold Medal
Recipients of the Praemium Imperiale
Compasso d'Oro Award recipients
Swiss companies established in 1978
Design companies established in 1978
Companies established in 1978
ETH Zurich
Swiss architects
Companies of Switzerland
Architecture firms